The District! is a 2004 Hungarian caricaturistic animated film directed by Áron Gauder. Its original title is a shortened colloquial form of nyolcadik kerület, the eighth district of Budapest, also known as Józsefváros, including an infamous neighbourhood where the film takes place.

It has been distributed in the Czech Republic, Slovakia, United Kingdom, France, the Benelux countries, Romania, Poland, Portugal and Taiwan, and it is going to be shown in the United States.

It was also shown at film festivals in Helsinki, Toronto, Copenhagen, Zagreb, Karlovy Vary and the below venues and it will be shown in Warsaw, Vancouver and São Paulo.

Plot
The film displays the Hungarian, Roma, Chinese and Arab dwellers and their alliances and conflicts in a humorous way, embedded into a fictive story of a few schoolchildren's oil-making time-travel and a Romeo and Juliet-type love of a Roma guy towards a white girl.

Cast and crew 
Directed by
Áron Gauder

Screenplay
Máriusz Bari
Viktor Nagy
Erik Novák
László Jakab Orsós

Produced by
Erik Novák

Original Music by
Erik Novák

Cast

Awards 

Notes:
:  The panel was shocked at the technological modernity of the film and at learning that it was only made from 105 million HUF (525,000 USD).
:  "For its visual innovation, energetic style, and fearless satire of contemporary culture and politics"
:  On the board Princess of Dneper — out of 130 films from 36 countries of the world.
:  Awarded to Director Aron Gauder

Festivals 

The film has been presented in several film festivals across the world, including:

 7 July 2005: Karlovy Vary Film Festival (Karlovy Vary, Czech Republic)
 24 August 2005: Copenhagen International Film Festival (Denmark)
 13 September 2005: Toronto International Film Festival (Canada)
 15–25 September 2005: Helsinki Film Festival
 September/October 2005: Melbourne International Film Festival 2005
 27 October 2005: Karlovy Vary International Film Festival
 18 November 2005: Waterloo Festival for Animated Cinema (Canada)
 18 November 2005: Oslo International Film Festival (Norway)
 1 February 2006: Gothenburg Film Festival (Gothenburg, Sweden)
 16 February 2006: !f Istanbul Independent Film Festival (Istanbul, Turkey)
 10 March 2006: Mar del Plata Film Festival (Mar del Plata, Argentina)
 7 April 2006: Philadelphia International Film Festival (Philadelphia, USA)
 3 June 2006: Transilvania International Film Festival (Cluj-Napoca, Romania)
 12 April 2007: Wisconsin Film Festival (Wisconsin, USA)
 6 December 2007: Festafife - Festival International de Marionetas e Cinema de Animação (Afife, Portugal) 
 5 January 2008: Project Twenty1 Film-A-Thon (Philadelphia, USA)

External links

References 

2004 films
2004 animated films
Hungarian animated films
Films based on Romeo and Juliet
Annecy Cristal for a Feature Film winners